The following is a list of Oakland Golden Grizzlies men's basketball head coaches. The Golden Grizzlies have had five coaches in their 50-season history. The team is currently coached by Greg Kampe.

Through 2016–17 season

* The 1978–79 season was coached by both Mitchell and Frederick.

References

Oakland

Oakland Golden Grizzlies basketball, men's, coaches